Angna is a Pakistani drama released on ARY Digital, written by Sameena Aijaz, directed by Saqib Zafar Khan & Tehseen Khan and produced by Abdullah Seja under the banner of  IDream Entertainment. It features Azfar Rehman, Ali Abbas, Rabab Hashim and Areeba Habib in lead roles.

Cast 

 Areeba Habib as Abeeha
 Azfar Rehman as Taimoor
 Rabab Hashim as Ehsaal
 Ali Abbas as Zain
 Laiba Khan as Nayyab
 Kanwal Khan as Aiza
 Asim Mehmood as Amaar
 Danial Afzal as Moosa
 Sajjad Pal as Raza
 Rabia Noreen as Taimoor's mother
 Gul-e-Rana as Dadi
 Mohsin Gillani as Taimoor's father
 Rubina Ashraf as Sania
 Atiqa Odho as Ehsaal's mother
 Javed Sheikh as Eshaal's father
 Beena Chaudhary as Nida's mother	
 Ismail Tara as Nida's father
Syed Saim Ali as Asad

Production
In late 2021, it was reported that Areeba Habib and Azfar Rehman are going to appear in ARY Digital serial titled Rukhsati, however, later it was changed to Angna. The serial reported to be a family-oriented drama. Areeba Habib appeared opposite Azfar Rehman and Rabab Hashim paired opposite Ali Abbas.

References

External links 
 

2022 Pakistani television series debuts
2022 Pakistani television series endings